Mouloudia Olympique de Béjaïa, referred to commonly as MO Béjaïa or MOB for short, is a professional Algerian football club based in Béjaïa, Algeria. The club was founded in 1954 and its colours are green and black. Their home stadium, Maghrebi Unity Stadium, has a capacity of 18,000 spectators. The club is currently playing in the Inter-Régions Division.

History
In May 2015, MO Béjaïa won the Algerian Cup, its first national title, after beating RC Arbaâ 1–0 in the 2015 final. In the 2016–17 Algerian top division, MOB drew an average home attendance of 11,000. Only MC Alger (13,000) and MC Oran (12,000) had a higher average home attendance in that season.

Honours

Domestic competitions
Algerian Ligue Professionnelle 1
Runners-up (1): 2014–15
Algerian Cup
Winners (1): 2015
Algerian Super Cup
Runners-up (1): 2015

International competitions
CAF Confederation Cup
Runners-up (1): 2016

Current squad

Managers
 Djaâfar Harouni (September 2003 – December 2003)
 Abdelhamid Azeroual (December 2003 – March 2004)
 Noureddine Saâdi (July 2005 – June 2006)
 Dan Anghelescu (July 2007 – December 2007)
 Hamid Rahmouni (July 1, 2011 – Sept 21, 2013)
 Fawzi Moussouni (interim) (Sept 22, 2013 – Sept 27, 2013)
 Abdelkader Amrani (September 2013 – June 2015)
 Alain Geiger (June 2015 – September 2015)
 Abdelkader Amrani (September 2015 – May 2016)
 Nacer Sandjak (June 2016–)

Rival Clubs
  JSM Béjaïa (Derby)
  USM Alger (Rivalry)
  CS Constantine (Rivalry)
  MC Oran (Rivalry)
  CRB Aïn Fakroun (Rivalry)
  MC El Eulma (Rivalry)
  CA Bordj Bou Arreridj (Rivalry)

References

External links
 Official fan site of MO Béjaïa
 MOB official site

 
Football clubs in Algeria
Association football clubs established in 1954
MO Bejaia
Algerian Ligue 2 clubs
1954 establishments in Algeria
Sports clubs in Algeria